3α-Androstanediol also known as 5α-androstane-3α,17β-diol and sometimes shortened in the literature to 3α-diol, is an endogenous steroid hormone and neurosteroid and a metabolite of androgens like dihydrotestosterone (DHT).

Biological activity
3α-Androstanediol is an inhibitory androstane neurosteroid and weak androgen and estrogen.

As a neurosteroid, it acts as a potent positive allosteric modulator of the GABAA receptor, and has been found to have rewarding, anxiolytic, pro-sexual, and anticonvulsant effects. As androgens such as testosterone and DHT are known to have many of the same effects as 3α-diol and are converted into it in vivo, it is thought that this compound may in part be responsible for said effects.

Relative to its isomer 3β-androstanediol, which is a potent estrogen, 3α-androstanediol has substantially lower, though still significant affinity for the estrogen receptors, with a several-fold preference for ERβ over ERα. It has approximately 0.07% and 0.3% of the affinity of estradiol at the ERα and ERβ, respectively.

Biochemistry

3α-Androstanediol shows high affinity for sex hormone-binding globulin (SHBG), similar to that of testosterone.

Chemistry

3α-Androstanediol, also known as 5α-androstane-3α,17β-diol, is a naturally occurring androstane steroid and a structural analogue of DHT (5α-androstan-17β-ol-3-one). A notable positional isomer of 3α-androstanediol is 3β-androstanediol.

An orally active synthetic analogue of 3α-androstanediol, 17α-ethynyl-3α-androstanediol (HE-3235, Apoptone), was formerly under investigation for the treatment of prostate cancer and breast cancer.

References

5α-Reduced steroid metabolites
Androgens and anabolic steroids
Androstanes
Estrogens
Human metabolites
Neurosteroids
GABAA receptor positive allosteric modulators
Selective ERβ agonists